Leave It to Me is a 1933 British comedy film directed by Monty Banks and starring Gene Gerrard, Olive Borden and Molly Lamont. It was made at Elstree Studios. The film's sets were designed by the art director David Rawnsley. It is an adaptation of the play Leave It to Psmith (1930) by Ian Hay and P.G. Wodehouse, which is based on Wodehouse's novel Leave It to Psmith (1923).

Cast
 Gene Gerrard as Sebastian Help  
 Olive Borden as Peavey  
 Molly Lamont as Eve Halliday  
 George K. Gee as Coots  
 Gus McNaughton as Baxter 
 Clive Currie as Lord Emsworth  
 Toni Edgar-Bruce as Lady Constance  
 Peter Godfrey as Siegffied Velour 
 Syd Crossley as Beach  
 Melville Cooper as Honorable Freddie  
 Wylie Watson as Client

References

Bibliography
 Low, Rachael. Filmmaking in 1930s Britain. George Allen & Unwin, 1985.
 Wood, Linda. British Films, 1927-1939. British Film Institute, 1986.

External links

1933 films
British comedy films
1933 comedy films
1930s English-language films
Films shot at British International Pictures Studios
Films directed by Monty Banks
British films based on plays
Films based on works by P. G. Wodehouse
Films based on works by Ian Hay
British black-and-white films
1930s British films